Bob and Mike Bryan were the defending champions, but lost in the semifinals to Jonathan Marray and Frederik Nielsen.

Marray and Nielsen defeated Robert Lindstedt and Horia Tecău in the final, 4–6, 6–4, 7–6(7–5), 6–7(5–7), 6–3 to win the gentlemen's doubles title at the 2012 Wimbledon Championships. Marray became the first British player to win the men's doubles title at Wimbledon since Pat Hughes and Raymond Tuckey in 1936. Nielsen is only the second Danish winner of a Grand Slam title, following his own grandfather, Kurt Nielsen, who won the mixed doubles at the 1957 U.S. National Championships.

Seeds

  Max Mirnyi /  Daniel Nestor (second round)
  Bob Bryan /  Mike Bryan (semifinals)
  Mariusz Fyrstenberg /  Marcin Matkowski (first round)
  Leander Paes /  Radek Štěpánek (third round)
  Robert Lindstedt /  Horia Tecău (final)
  Alexander Peya /  Nenad Zimonjić (first round)
  Mahesh Bhupathi /  Rohan Bopanna (second round)
  Aisam-ul-Haq Qureshi /  Jean-Julien Rojer (third round)
  Marcel Granollers /  Marc López (first round)
  Jürgen Melzer /  Philipp Petzschner (semifinals)
  František Čermák /  Filip Polášek (first round)
  Santiago González /  Christopher Kas (second round)
  Colin Fleming /  Ross Hutchins (first round)
  Eric Butorac /  Jamie Murray (second round)
  Ivan Dodig /  Marcelo Melo (quarterfinals)
  André Sá /  Bruno Soares (second round)

Qualifying

Draw

Finals

Top half

Section 1

Section 2

Bottom half

Section 3

Section 4

References

External links

2012 Wimbledon Championships – Men's draws and results at the International Tennis Federation

Men's Doubles
Wimbledon Championship by year – Men's doubles